Quercus mongolica, commonly known as Mongolian oak, is a species of oak native to Japan, China, Korea, Mongolia, and Siberia.

The flavono-ellagitannins mongolicin A and B can be found in Quercus mongolica var. grosseserrata.

References

External links 

 line drawing,  Flora of China Illustrations vol. 4, fig. 365, 1-3 

mongolica
Flora of Siberia
Flora of Mongolia
Flora of China
Flora of Eastern Asia
Plants described in 1850